Alabang Town Center (also known colloquially as Town and abbreviated as ATC) is a shopping lifestyle center located south of Metro Manila, located next to gated residential communities and bustling business developments. It is owned by Ayala Malls and is considered one of the oldest shopping malls owned and operated by Ayala Malls since it opened in 1982.

It has a total  of retail space and has a number of high-end retail stores including Rustan's Department Store and a number of high-end brands, including Marks & Spencer and The Gap. Another major tenant of the mall is the passport office of the Department of Foreign Affairs located on the fourth level of the Metro Department Store which opened in August 2013. Alabang Town Center caters to the retail needs of citizens living in southern Metro Manila, particularly those from Las Piñas, Parañaque, and Muntinlupa.

History

Alabang Town Center opened in 1982 as a strip mall with a supermarket and two cinemas that had the St. Jerome Emiliani and Sta. Susana Parish, a Roman Catholic church which was built in the 1970s, as its anchor tenant. The mall was expanded in 1994 and 2007 and became a cosmopolitan Mediterranean-designed, airy lifestyle center. In February 2011, expansion of Alabang center was underway incorporating Metro, which is known for its comfortable and friendly retail outlets all over the country. The four-level Metro replaced the open parking lot near McDonald's housing a department store, a grocery store, and basement parking. Construction commenced last October 20 and the Metro opened in 2012. A new wing linking the Metro became operational late 2011 in which 70 new stores were opened.

In 2012, there was an expansion and a new wing known as the lifestyle strip saw many restaurants, stores, and shops added. The same year, restaurants outside at the Corte de las Palmas, such as Chili's, Jamba Juice and Krispy Kreme were opened.

The Metro supermarket opened on August 11, 2012, while their department store opened on August 18, 2012. Parking was also opened to Metro and ATC customers.

In 2015, the ATC Corporate Center, an office building integrated with the mall, was opened. In 2016, there are further plans for redevelopment which will include a new Lifestyle Centre.

See also
 List of largest shopping malls
 List of largest shopping malls in the Philippines
 List of shopping malls in Metro Manila

References

External links
Alabang Town Center Official website

Shopping malls in Muntinlupa
Buildings and structures in Muntinlupa
Ayala Malls
Shopping malls established in 1982